Goodenia campestris is a species of flowering plant in the family Goodeniaceae and is endemic to northern Australia. It is a low-lying herb with egg-shaped to lance-shaped stem leaves and racemes of yellowish flowers with purple veins.

Description

Taxonomy and naming
Goodenia campestris was first formally described in 1990 by Roger Charles Carolin in the journal Telopea from material he collected near Timber Creek in 1968. The specific epithet (campestris) means "pertaining to a field", referring to the grassy plains where this species grows.

Distribution and habitat
This goodenia grows in grassland on black soil plains in the Victoria Bonaparte region of the Northern Territory and Western Australia.

Conservation status
Goodenia campestris is classified as "not threatened" by the Government of Western Australia Department of Parks and Wildlife, and as "data deficient" under the Northern Territory Government Territory Parks and Wildlife Conservation Act 1976.

References

campestris
Eudicots of Western Australia
Flora of the Northern Territory
Plants described in 1990
Taxa named by Roger Charles Carolin